Lesticus nitescens is a species of ground beetle in the subfamily Pterostichinae. It was described by Sloane in 1907.

References

Lesticus
Beetles described in 1907